Bispham, Lancashire may refer to: 
Bispham, Blackpool
Bispham, a civil parish containing the village of Bispham Green, West Lancashire